Philip Tilden (31 May 1887 – 25 February 1956) was an English architect, active in the early twentieth century, who worked for some of the most prominent members of English society, including Winston Churchill, David Lloyd George, Lord Beaverbrook, Sir Philip Sassoon, Lady Ottoline Morrell and Gordon Selfridge.

Biography
Tilden was born on 31 May 1887, the son of William Augustus Tilden, a prominent chemist who discovered synthetic rubber. Educated at Bedales and Rugby, Tilden joined the Architectural Association in 1905, leaving in 1908 to become an articled pupil to Thomas Edward Collcutt, with whom he later went into partnership.  By 1917, he had established his own practice and for the next twenty years worked almost exclusively for a small circle of rich, interconnected, patrons for whom he designed, or re-constructed, country houses, gardens, chapels and churches, castles and a vast tower that was intended to sit on top of Gordon Selfridge's department store on Oxford Street, London.

His best known works, apart from the unexecuted design for the Selfridges tower, were all for politicians: from 1918 to 1923 he designed the Moorish Courtyard, compared by Honor Channon to a "Spanish brothel", and the gardens and swimming pools at Port Lympne for Lloyd George's secretary, Philip Sassoon and may also have worked for Sassoon at Trent Park. Later in 1920s he completely reconstructed Chartwell for Winston Churchill and during the same period built Bron-y-de, at Churt in Surrey, as a country house for David Lloyd George.

By the late 1920s, Tilden's career had peaked: near bankruptcy, following some failed speculative developments; combined with a mental breakdown, which Bettley attributes to Tilden's attempting to reconcile his homosexuality with his marriage to Amalia Broden, a Swedish author; led to his leaving London entirely and moving to Devon. The latter part of his career was spent mainly in the West Country, where he undertook the restoration of a number of, mostly, more important country houses for  less socially eminent clients.  Examples include the reconstruction of Antony House in Cornwall and of Sydenham House in Devon.

Many of Tilden's buildings now enjoy Listed Building status although this is sometimes due to the fame of their owners, or to work that pre-dated Tilden, rather than to his own efforts: examples include Port Lympne Mansion, Grade II* listed as at 29 December 1966; Chartwell, Grade I listed as at 16 January 1975, and Antony House, Grade I listed as at 21 July 1951.

In 1954 Tilden published his autobiography, True Remembrances: the memoirs of an architect. Bettley considered it highly unreliable. Philip Tilden died on 25 February 1956 at Shute, Devon. His obituary in The Times, described him as "an architect with a talent for restoring old buildings, though of a somewhat lush and luxurious taste."

List of major works
 Allington Castle, Kent, 1917–33, reconstruction for Sir Martin Conway
 Antony House, Cornwall, 1945–47, alterations for Sir John Carew Pole
 Bron-y-de, Churt, Surrey, 1922–28, house for David Lloyd George, destroyed by fire in 1968
 Chartwell, Kent, 1923–24, alterations for Winston Churchill
 Cherkley Court, Leatherhead, Surrey, 1926, alterations for Lord Beaverbrook
 Garsington Manor, Oxfordshire, 1925–26, terrace and loggia for Lady Ottoline Morrell
 Long Crendon Manor, Buckinghamshire, 1918-1922, restoration for Laline Hohler
 Luscombe Castle, Devon, alterations for Sir Peter Hoare
 Luton Hoo, Hertfordshire, 1947, repairs after wartime use
 Port Lympne Mansion, Kent, 1918–23, alterations for Sir Philip Sassoon
 Prussia Cove, Cornwall, 1911–14, house for T.T. and Brian Behrens
Saltwood Castle, Kent, 1930s, reconstruction for Sir Martin Conway
 Shrigley Hall, Cheshire, 1935–38, chapel for the Salesian Brothers

Notes

References

Sources
 
 
 
 

1887 births
1956 deaths
20th-century English architects
People educated at Bedales School
People educated at Rugby School